Ski Mask may refer to:

 Balaclava (clothing), also known as a ski mask
 Ski Mask the Slump God (born 1996), American rapper and songwriter
 Ski Mask (album), 2013 album by Islands

See also
 Ski (disambiguation)
 Mask (disambiguation)
 "Ski Mask Way", 2005 song by 50 Cent from the album The Massacre
 Michael H. Kenyon (born 1944), American criminal nicknamed the "Enema Bandit" or the "Ski Masked Bandit"